Tan Yang (Chinese: 谈杨; pinyin: Tán Yáng; born 9 January 1989) is a Chinese former footballer who played as a striker and centre-back.

Club career
Tan Yang started his football career when he joined Zhejiang Greentown's youth academy in 2003. He had a brief trial with Ligue 1 side Sochaux in February 2007. He made his debut for the club when he made his debut against Qingdao Jonoon on 5 April 2008 in a 2–0 loss. Often coming on as a substitute, he would nevertheless score two league goals throughout the campaign, with his debut goal coming against Changchun Yatai in a 2–2 draw on 12 November 2008. After several seasons for Hangzhou, he could not maintain a consistent run within the team and he was released by the club at the end of the 2011 season. Halfway through the 2012 season, Hangzhou decided to bring back Tan and soon loaned him out to third-tier club Hebei Zhongji. Tan transferred to Hebei on a permanent deal in January 2013.

Tan signed a two-year contract with Campeonato Nacional de Seniores side C.D. Mafra on 24 July 2013. On 25 August 2013, he scored his first goal for his side in a match against Atlético Riachense which ended 2–0. On 1 July 2014, Tan transferred to Segunda Liga side S.C. Farense. He made his first appearance for the club on 16 November 2014 in a 2–2 draw against Desportivo Aves and also scored his first goal for the club in the same match.
On 26 June 2015, Tan was loaned to China League One side Hebei Zhongji.

On 3 January  2016, Tan returned to Hangzhou Greentown. He would make his debut on 30 April 2016 in a league game against Henan Jianye that ended in a 1-0 defeat. This would be followed by his first goal for the club on 25 June 2016 in a league game against Hebei China Fortune FC that ended in a 1-0 victory. Unfortunately he would be part of the squad that was relegated at the end of the season. He would go on to be converted into a centre-back and captain of the team before he would aid them to promotion to the top tier at the end of the 2021 campaign. He would retire from professional football after the 2021 season and move into coaching.

International career
Tan made his debut for the Chinese national team in a 3–1 win against Palestine on 18 July 2009, coming on as a substitute for Qu Bo.

Career statistics 
Statistics accurate as of match played 27 April 2022.

References

External links

Player stats at Sports.sohu.com

1989 births
Living people
Footballers from Wuhan
Chinese footballers
China international footballers
Chinese Super League players
China League One players
China League Two players
Zhejiang Professional F.C. players
Hebei F.C. players
C.D. Mafra players
S.C. Farense players
Chinese expatriate footballers
Expatriate footballers in Portugal
Chinese expatriate sportspeople in Portugal
Association football forwards